This is a list of award winners and league leaders for the Houston Astros, an American professional baseball team based in Houston.  The Astros compete in Major League Baseball (MLB) as a member club of the American League (AL), having moved to the league in 2013 after spending their first 51 seasons in the National League (NL).

The Astros feature twelve total personnel who have been inducted into the National Baseball Hall of Fame and Museum, two Most Valuable Player (MVP) Award winners, four Cy Young Award winners, and three Rookie of the Year Award winners. Two players have won an annual batting championship, while eight pitchers have led the league in earned run average (ERA).

Team awards

National Baseball Hall of Fame honors

Hall of Fame inductees

Ford C. Frick Award recipients

Major League Baseball awards

Postseason awards

Annual awards

Most Valuable Player Award (MVP)

Cy Young Award

Rookie of the Year Award (ROY)

Manager of the Year Award (MOY)

Hank Aaron Award

Rolaids Relief Man Award

Comeback Player of the Year Award

All-Stars

All-MLB Team

Rawlings Gold and Platinum Glove Awards

Silver Slugger Award

Monthly awards

Awards for leadership, inspiration, and community service

MLB "This Year in Baseball Awards"

Note: These awards were renamed the "GIBBY Awards" (Greatness in Baseball Yearly) in 2010 and then the "Esurance MLB Awards in 2015.

"GIBBY Awards" Best Breakout Everyday Player
2014 – José Altuve

Players Choice Awards

Media and partnership awards

Associated Press

Baseball America awards

ESPY Award

Fielding Bible

Hickok Belt

Sporting News Awards
 MLB Player of the Year
 1994: Jeff Bagwell
 2016, 2017: José Altuve
 Pitcher of the Year:
 1979: Joe Niekro
 1986: Mike Scott
 1999: Mike Hampton
 2015: Dallas Keuchel
 2019: Gerrit Cole
 2022: Justin Verlander
 Rookie of the Year:
 1965: Joe Morgan (2B)
 1969: Tom Griffin (P)
 1974: Greg Gross (OF)
 1979: Jeffrey Leonard (OF)
 1991: Jeff Bagwell (1B)
 1991: Al Osuna (P)
 2001: Roy Oswalt (P)
 2005: Willy Taveras (OF)
 2015: Carlos Correa (SS)
 2019: Yordan Álvarez (DH)
 Comeback Player of the Year: 
 1981: Bob Knepper
 Manager of the Year:
 1981: Bill Virdon
 1986: Hal Lanier

Sports Illustrated

Topps All-Star Rookie Teams

Wilson Sporting Goods

Minor-league system

California League Pitcher of the Year
 2014 – Josh Hader

Houston Astros Minor League Player of the Year
 2014 – Brett Phillips

Houston Astros Minor League Pitcher of the Year
 2014 – Josh Hader

Other achievements

Ford C. Frick Award
See:

Retired numbers
See:

Darryl Kile Good Guy Award
See  and footnote

2003 – Jeff Bagwell
2004 – Roy Oswalt
2005 – Morgan Ensberg
2006 – Brad Lidge
2007 – Woody Williams
2008 – Hunter Pence
2009 – Brian Moehler
2010 – Geoff Blum
2011 – Jason Bourgeois
2012 – Jason Castro 
2013 – Carlos Corporán
2014 – Scott Feldman
2015 – Hank Conger
2016 – Collin McHugh
 2017 – Carlos Correa
 2018 – Charlie Morton
 2019 – Will Harris
 2020 – Brad Peacock
 2021 – Alex Bregman
 2022 – Martín Maldonado

Texas Sports Hall of Fame
See:

Annual batting statistical leaders

Triple Crown categories

Rate statistics leaders

Cumulative statistical leaders

Other leaders

Annual pitching statistical leaders

Triple Crown categories

Rate statistical leaders

Cumulative statistical leaders

Annual fielding leaders

All players

Most errors committed

Player value leaders

Wins Above Replacement (WAR)

See also

 Baseball awards
 Baseball statistics
 List of MLB awards
 Sabermetrics

References
Footnotes

Sources

Awa
Major League Baseball team trophies and awards